Aberdeen High School is a public high school in Aberdeen, Idaho.

The current principal is Travis Pincock and the school has 34 faculty members. Enrollment is approximately 200 students in grades 9–12.

Notable alumni
Ernest H. Taves (1916-2003) Psychiatrist, Author and UFO skeptic

References

Public high schools in Idaho
Schools in Bingham County, Idaho